Keizo Morishita (Kitakyushu, 4 February 1944 – Milan, 5 April 2003) was a Japanese painter who lived most of his life in Italy.

Academy and early years
Morishita was born in Kitakyūshū-shi, in the Fukuoka Prefecture in Japan. In 1963, at 19 years old, he obtained a scholarship and moved to Milan to study Arts. He attended Marino Marini’s classes at the Brera Fine Arts Academy, where he graduated in 1968. Although Morishita majored in sculpture, his elected medium was painting. His mixed cultural identity, paired with a great intellectual curiosity, prompted him to explore different strategies and procedures from the majority of his fellow students. In the early Sixties, Morishita had direct contact with the avant-garde art scene in milan, which was still linked with Spatialism. His first solo exhibition took place in 1967 at Galleria La Chiocciola in Padova.

Artistic career
Throughout his career Morishita exhibited mostly in Italy, with exhibitions in Milan, Rome, Venice, Turin, Florence, Padova and Brescia. He also exhibited his work in Switzerland (Lugano and Geneva); France (Paris and Saint Tropez); Denmark (Copenhagen); Belgium (Ghent); England (Chester); Taiwan, China, Mexico, and  Japan (Tokyo, Osaka, Nagoya, Niigata and his hometown Kitakyūshū). Many art critics and curators have written about his work, including Franco Russoli, Roberto Sanesi, Emilio Tadini, Valerio Adami, Ottavio Missoni, Milena Milani, Carlo Franza, Luigi Carluccio, Renzo Margonari, Walter Schönenberger, Taijin Tendo, Keiko Asako, Tani Arata and Rolly Marchi.

Morishita died on 5 April 2003 in Milan.

Solo and group exhibitions
 1967 - Galleria La Chiocciola, Padova
 1969 - Galleria Richard Foncke, Ghent, Belgium
 1970 - Studio Marconi, Milan 
 1972 - Galleria 42, Bologna
 1972 - Galleria Barozzi Arte Contemporanea, Venice
 1972 - Studio Paolo Barozzi, Milan
 1972 - Studio Marconi, Milan
 1973 - Galleria San Luca, Bologna
 1973 - Galleria interarte, Genova
 1974 - Galleria Il Triangolo, Pescara
 1974 - Galleria La Chiocciola, Padova
 1975 - Studio Marconi, Milan
 1975 - Galleria Menghelli, Florence
 1975 - Galleria San Luca, Bologna
 1975 - Galleria Margherita, Taranto
 1975 - Galleria Lanza, Intra
 1975 - Galleria Richard Foncke, Ghent
 1975 - Galleria Galliata, Alassio
 1975 - Galleria il Tritone Dialoghi Club, Biella
 1976 - Galleria Documenta, Turin
 1976 - Galleria il Tritone Dialoghi Club, Biella
 1977 - Gallerie L’Enseigne du Cerceau, Paris
 1977 - Galleria La Chiocciola, Padova
 1977 - Galleria Panchieri, Rovereto
 1977 - Galerie Marie-Louise Jeanneret, Geneva
 1978 - Galleria Dieci, Trieste
 1978 - Galeria Lanza, Intra
 1979 - Jiyugaoka Gallery, Tokyo
 1979 - Ranka-Do Gallery, Osaka
 1979 - Akira Ikeda Gallery, Nagoya
 1980 - Studio Marconi, Milan
 1980 - Seibu Departement Store Gallery, Tokyo
 1980 - Ohfunato Dajichi Gallery, Ohfuriato
 1980 - Head Art Gallery, Urawa
 1980 - Gallerie Petit Formes Gallery, Osaka
 1981 - Galleria Dialoghi Club, Biella
 1981 - Azienda del Turismo Comune di Modena
 1981 - Studio d’Ars, Milan
 1982 - Chikugo Gallery, Kurume
 1982 - Kuraya Gallery, Kitakyushu
 1982 - Kumo Gallery, Tokyo
 1982 - Jiyugaoka Gallery, Tokyo
 1982 - Koh Gallery, Tokyo
 1982 - Banco Santo Spirito, Rome
 1983 - Galleria Lanza, Intra
 1983 - 505 Gallery, Tokyo
 1983 - Gallery Chimeria, Tokyo
 1983 - Studio Marconi, Milan
 1983 - Galleria Dialoghi Club, Biella
 1983 - Galleria Nove Colonne, Trento
 1984 - Galleria Il Salotto, Como
 1984 - Galleria La Chiocciola, Padova
 1984 - Ginza Gallery, Tokyo
 1984 - Studio Malpensata, Lugano
 1984 - Galleria Passardi, Lugano
 1985 - Studio F.22, Palazzolo
 1985 - Ginza Gallery, Tokyo
 1985 - Kumo Gallery, Tokyo
 1985 - Kodoshia Gallery, Inchionoseki
 1985 - Galleria Waldhause, Sils-Maria
 1986 - Casa della Cultura Gobierno Estado de Puebla, Mexico City
 1986 - Rafael Matos Galeria de Arte, Mexico City
 1986 - Artestudio 36, Lecce
 1987 - Asia Art Gallery, Taipei 
 1988 - Studio F.22, Palazzolo 
 1989 - Villa Berlucchi, Franciacorta
 1990 - Studio F.22, Palazzolo 
 1990 - Galleria La Bussola, Turin
 1991 - Galleria Eight Street, Tokyo
 1992 - Galeri Ægidus, Randers, Denmark
 1993 - Tenju-en Museum, Nijgata
 1993 - Hambara-Hanga Museum, Mizunami-shi
 1993 - Hara Museurn Arc, Shibukawa-shi
 1994 - Città di Osimo
 1994 - Big&Great, Palazzo Martinengo, Brescia
 1994 - Studio F.22, Palazzolo 
 1995 - Gallery Apa, Nagoja
 1995 - Kunngi Gallery, Tokyo
 1996 - Galleria La Bussola, Turin
 1996 - Città di Castelmaggiore, Cremona
 1996 - Studio F.22, Palazzolo 
 1997 - Convento dell ‘ Annunciata, Rovato Brescia
 1998 - Galleria Artestudio, Milan
 1998 - Museo d’Arte Moderna, Gazoldo degli Ippoliti
 1998 - Spazio Cultura, Milena Milani, Cortina d’Ampezzo
 1998 - Studio F.22, Palazzolo 
 1998 - Museo d’ Arte Moderna, Gazoldo degli Ippoliti M
 1999 - Galleria Anna Osemont, Albissola 
 1999 - General Consulate of Japan, Milan
 1999 - Studio F.22, Palazzolo 
 2000 - Galleria del Naviglio, Milan
 2000 - Galleria del Naviglio, Venice
 2000 - Galleria Giotto and Company, Vigevano
 2000 - Priamar Arte, Savona
 2000 - Cantine di Franciacorta, Erbusco
 2000 - Studio F.22, Palazzolo 
 2001 - Kohln Rathaus, Cologne
 2002 - Comune di Sesto Calende
 2002 - Debbie’s Choice, Chester 
 2002 - Comune di Sondrio: Il colore dei sogni
 2002 - Comune di Montagnana
 2002 - Palazzo Pretorio, Sondrio
 2002 - Atelier d’ Arte Savaia Albisola 
 2003 - Studio F.22, Palazzolo 
 2005 - Comune di Teglio
 2006 - Studio F.22, Palazzolo 
 2006 - Comune di Cesena
 2007 - Collezione d’arte contemporanea Lina Bortolon, Feltre
 2009 - Studio F.22, Palazzolo 
 2010 - Atelier Giuseppe Ajmone, Carpignano Sesia 

Japanese painters
Japanese contemporary artists
Japanese expatriates in Italy
Brera Academy alumni
Italian contemporary artists
1944 births
2003 deaths